The 2018 NAPA Auto Parts Idaho 208 was a NASCAR K&N Pro Series West race held at Meridan Speedway in Meridian, Idaho. Hailie Deegan won the race, the first ever victory by a female in K&N Pro Series history. Her Bill McAnally Racing teammates Cole Rouse and Derek Kraus finished second and third respectively. Kraus won the pole and led the most laps, leading the first 189 of 208.

Report

Race

Derek Kraus took the pole and led the first 189 laps. With 20 laps to go, Taylor Canfield, who was making his series debut, spun in front of Kraus and blocked the racetrack. Kraus tried to avoid him but hit the outside wall and lost the lead to his Bill McAnally Racing teammate Cole Rouse. After the ensuing caution, Rouse held the lead until the final lap of the race, when Hailie Deegan tapped his left-rear quarter panel in turn one, making a last-lap pass. Deegan went on to score the win, the first of her career, while Rouse and Kraus finished second and third to complete a podium sweep for BMR. Deegan led only the final lap.

Post-race

Deegan's victory was her first career win and the first win by a female in history at the K&N Pro Series West level of NASCAR. Deegan was ecstatic after the win, explaining, "This has to be the best day of my life right here. It doesn't get any better than this. People don't understand how many days, how many hours I've put into this. How much work I've done to get to this moment. It’s just amazing … this is the happiest day of my life." 

Immediately following the race, Rouse expressed displeasure with Deegan's bump and run-style pass on the final lap, saying, "We were going into Turn 1...and she doesn't lift and drives into me, gets me completely sideways. We were going to win that race if it was run clean, but unfortunately it wasn't." He continued by saying he would race Deegan hard the last two races of the season: "I'm just going to go into the next two races, not give her any slack and we're going to win both of those. It was a good night, but I don't really care about second, honestly." The next day, however, Rouse tweeted that he "got over it quick" and called Deegan "an amazing girl and amazing talent," adding, "I'm happy for her! She made history and I'm a part of it." Kraus, meanwhile, was unhappy due to the incident with Canfield (Canfield's third of the night). "We led 190+ laps, then a lapped car spun again. I was predicting he was going to roll down because he didn't have his brakes on yet. But he stayed there, and I was already committed [to the top]...and I guess NASCAR ruled me third. I don't know, I guess we'll go onto Roseville and Kern and win them two."

Results

Qualifying

Race results

Standings after the race

Note: Only the top ten positions are included for the driver standings.

References

NAPA Auto Parts Idaho 208
NAPA Auto Parts Idaho 208
NAPA Auto Parts Idaho 208
Motorsport in Idaho
NAPA Auto Parts Idaho 208